Giulio Cesare Arrivabene (1806 in Mantua – 1896 in Florence) was an Italian painter, active initially in a neoclassical style, mainly painting historic and religious canvases. He also was active as a portraitist.

He trained under Luigi Sabatelli at the Brera Academy. In 1833, as a student he produced an essay titled Aman in ginocchio davanti a Ester. In 1845, he participated in the decoration of the Palazzo Torlonia in Rome. He painted a Il divorzio di Enrico VIII (The Divorce of Henry VIII) for the Marchese Ala Ponzone of Milan; and a Cola di Rienzo and Italy at the foot of the Virgin (exhibited in 1850 at Turin). In 1841, he was commissioned by the Savoy Royal family a painting depicting the Reconsecration of the Hautecombe Abbey for the Castello di Racconigi.

After 1853, he moved to Florence, and gained many commissions from the aristocracy.  He painted a Henry IV at Canossa (Accademia Nazionale Virgiliana, Mantua), Apotheosis of San Leonardo (Apse of church of San Leonardo, Mantua), and  Imelda de' Lambertazzi (exhibited in 1870 at Parma). Among his works are  Jesus among the Doctors (church of Sant'Egidio (Mantua)), St Anthony of Padua scolds Ezzelino da Romano (1846, Sant'Andrea, Mantua). The parish church of Sustinente, dedicated to San Michele Arcangelo, has a St Michael Archangel and a  St Lucia and Filomena by Arrivabene.

References

1806 births
1896 deaths
19th-century Italian painters
Italian male painters
Painters from Mantua
Brera Academy alumni
19th-century Italian sculptors
Italian male sculptors
19th-century Italian male artists